The 2007 Belgian Super Cup was a football match played on 28 July 2007, between league winners R.S.C. Anderlecht and cup winners Club Brugge.

Match details

See also
Belgian Supercup

Belgian Super Cup 2007
Belgian Super Cup 2007
Belgian Super Cup, 2007
Belgian Supercup
July 2007 sports events in Europe